Witherell is a surname, and may refer to:

 Benjamin F. H. Witherell (1797-1867) American jurist in Michigan
 James Witherell (1759-1838), American politician and jurist in Vermont and Michigan
 Elizabeth Witherell, editor-in-chief of The Writings of Henry D. Thoreau
 Michael S. Witherell (born 1949), physicist, director of Lawrence Berkeley National Laboratory and formerly director of Fermilab.

See also
 Justice Witherell (disambiguation)